Françoise-Louise de Warens, born Louise Éléonore de la Tour du Pil, also called Madame de Warens (31 March 1699 – 29 July 1762), was the benefactress and mistress of Jean-Jacques Rousseau.

Life 
Warens was born in Vevey, into a Swiss Protestant family who had immigrated to Annecy. She was educated in boarding schools. In 1713, she was married to Sébastien-Isaac de Loys. 

She became a Roman Catholic in 1726 in order to receive a church pension which had been instated to increase the spread of Roman Catholicism near Geneva, then a bastion of Protestantism. She had her marriage annulled.

She was known to have led a liberal life for a woman of her time. She annulled her marriage to M. de Warens in 1726 after failing in a clothing business. Rousseau met her for the first time on Palm Sunday 1728. It was said that she was a spy and a converter for Savoy, then part of the Kingdom of Sardinia. In  1731, she settled at Chambéry. In 1735, she and Rousseau settled at the Domaine des Charmettes. 

Though Warens was originally a teacher to Rousseau, they became sexually engaged after she openly initiated him in the matters of love and "intimacy". Françoise-Louise de Warens died in poverty in 1762 in Chambéry, of which Rousseau did not learn until six years afterwards. Rousseau describes his relationship with her in his Confessions.

Notes

People from Vevey
Converts to Roman Catholicism from Calvinism
Swiss Roman Catholics
1699 births
1762 deaths
Jean-Jacques Rousseau